Khartoum is a 1966 British epic war film written by Robert Ardrey and directed by Basil Dearden. It stars Charlton Heston as British General Charles "Chinese" Gordon and Laurence Olivier as Muhammad Ahmed (a Sudanese leader whose devotees proclaimed him the Mahdi), with a supporting cast that includes Richard Johnson and Ralph Richardson. The film is based on historical accounts of Gordon's defence of the Sudanese city of Khartoum from the forces of the Mahdist army, during the 1884–1885 Siege of Khartoum. The opening and closing scenes are narrated by Leo Genn.

Khartoum was filmed by cinematographer Edward Scaife in Technicolor and Ultra Panavision 70, and was exhibited in 70 mm Cinerama in premiere engagements. A novelization of the film's screenplay was written by Alan Caillou.

The film had its Royal World Premiere at the Casino Cinerama Theatre, in the West End of London, on 9 June 1966, in the presence of Princess Margaret and the Earl of Snowdon.

Khartoum earned Robert Ardrey an Oscar nomination for Best Screenplay. The film also earned Ralph Richardson a BAFTA Award nomination for Best British Actor.

Plot 
In 1883, in the Sudan, a force of 10,000 poorly trained Egyptian troops is lured into the Sudanese desert. Commanding the force is former Bombay Army soldier Colonel William "Billy" Hicks (Edward Underdown), now a private individual in the pay of the Egyptian government. There he is defeated by native tribesmen led by Muhammad Ahmed (Laurence Olivier), a Nubian religious leader of the Samaniyya order in Sudan who had declared himself Mahdi. British Prime Minister William Ewart Gladstone (Ralph Richardson), does not wish to send any military forces to Khartoum but is under great pressure, mostly from the British press, to "avenge" the death of Hicks, a hero of previous colonial conflicts. He could send colonial military hero Major General Charles George Gordon (Charlton Heston) who has strong ties to Sudan, having tried to break the slave trade there, but Gladstone distrusts him. Gordon has a reputation for strong and eccentric religious beliefs, and following his own judgement regardless of his orders. Lord Granville (Michael Hordern), the Foreign Secretary, knowing this; he tells Gladstone that by sending Gordon to Khartoum, the British government can ignore all public pressure to send an army there. Should Gordon ignore his orders, the government can absolve themselves of any responsibility over the area. Gladstone is mildly shocked at the suggestion, but as it is popular with the public and Queen Victoria, he adopts it for the sake of expediency.

Gordon is told that his mission, to evacuate troops and civilians, is unsanctioned by the British government, which will disavow all responsibility if he fails. He is given few resources and only a single aide, Colonel J. D. H. Stewart (Richard Johnson). After an attempt to recruit former slaver Zobeir Pasha (Zia Mohyeddin) fails, Gordon and Stewart travel to Khartoum, where Gordon is hailed as the city's savior upon his arrival in February 1884. He begins organising the defences and rallying the people, despite Stewart's protests that this is not what he was sent to do.

Gordon's first act is to visit the Mahdi in his insurgent camp, accompanied by only a single servant. He gains the Mahdi's respect and, in the verbal fencing at the parley, discovers that the Sudanese leader intends to make an example of Khartoum by taking the city and killing all its inhabitants. The River Nile city of Khartoum lies at the confluence of the White Nile and the Blue Nile. A qualified military engineer, Gordon wastes no time upon his return in digging a ditch between the two to provide a protective moat.

In Britain, Gladstone, apprised of how desperate the situation has become, orders Gordon to leave, but, as he had feared, his command is ignored. Colonel Stewart is sent by Gordon to London to explain the situation in Khartoum. Over the next several months, a public outcry forces Gladstone to send a relief force, but he sees to it that there is no urgency, hoping to the last that Gordon will come to his senses and save himself.

Gordon, however, has other ideas. News arrives in Khartoum about a relief force led by General Wolseley being sent from Britain. When the waters recede in winter, drying up his moat, the small Egyptian army is finally overwhelmed by 100,000 native Mahdist tribesmen. On 26 January 1885, the city falls under a massive frontal assault. Gordon himself is slaughtered along with the entire foreign garrison and populace of some 30,000, although the Mahdi had forbidden killing Gordon. In the end, Gordon's head is cut off, stuck on top of a long pole, and paraded about the city in triumph, contrary to the Mahdi's injunctions.

The British relief column arrives two days too late. The British withdraw from the Sudan shortly thereafter, and the Mahdi himself dies six months later. In the United Kingdom, public pressure, and anger at the fate of Gordon, eventually forces the British and their Egyptian allies to re-invade the Sudan ten years later, and they recaptured and colonised Khartoum in 1898.

Cast

 Charlton Heston as General Charles Gordon: military governor of Sudan, commander and an engineer. 
 Laurence Olivier as Muhammad Ahmed, the Mahdi
 Richard Johnson as Col. John Stewart: Gordon's aide.
 Ralph Richardson as William Ewart Gladstone, Prime Minister
 Alexander Knox as Sir Evelyn Baring, Consul-General of Egypt
 Johnny Sekka as Khaleel
 Nigel Green as General Wolseley: a British Army officer.
 Michael Hordern as Lord Granville, the British Foreign Secretary
 Peter Arne as Major Kitchener: a British Army officer.
 Hugh Williams as Lord Hartington
 Zia Mohyeddin as Zobeir Pasha: former slaver. 
 Ralph Michael as Charles Dilke
 Douglas Wilmer as Khalifa Abdullah
 Edward Underdown as William Hicks
 Alan Tilvern as Awaan

Roger Delgado, George Pastell and Jerome Willis also had parts.

Production

Development
Robert Ardrey wrote the script at the encouragement of producer Julian Blaustein. Ardrey says it took him three years "on and off" but once he did it he sold it for $150,000.

In May 1962 MGM announced they would make the film from Ardrey's script. It was to be an adventure movie in the vein of 55 Days at Peking and Lawrence of Arabia.

In October 1963 Ardrey scouted locations in Africa with Blaustein.

"Everybody was interested and nobody doubted the subject," said writer Robert Ardrey. "But there was strong feeling against the big picture which might gross $12,000,000 but cost $25,000,000. Frankly Khartoum is a proposition that could bust a studio if handled the wrong way."

In April 1964 Blaustein announced he would make the film for United Artists and that Burt Lancaster would star as Gordon. The following month Laurence Olivier agreed to play the Mahdi and Lewis Gilbert signed to direct.

However filming was pushed back meaning Lancaster, Olivier and Gilbert had to pull out. In April 1965 Charlton Heston agreed to play Gordon. By June Olivier was back on the film with Basil Dearden to direct. In July 1965, it was announced that Ralph Richardson and Richard Johnson would join the cast as Prime Minister Gladstone and Colonel Stewart respectively.

Shooting
Filming took place in Egypt, Pinewood Studios and London. It started at Pinewood on August 9, 1965 then in September moved to Egypt. Once location filming finished, the shoot went on hiatus to give Olivier time to be available for interior scenes in December.

It was the last movie filmed in Ultra Panavision 70 until The Hateful Eight, written and directed by Quentin Tarantino forty-nine years later.

Reception
Reviews for Khartoum at the time were generally positive. Sight and Sound described the film as being "beautifully photographed, lavishly mounted, intelligently acted, but ultimately dull." The Times praised the film for the screenplay. However negative reviews came from The Daily Telegraph and the New Statesman, which criticized the film for its historical inaccuracies (for example the Mahdi did not want to kill everyone in the capital and called for killing only soldiers).

On Rotten Tomatoes, the film has an average rating of 7/10.

In the 21st century, popular historian Alex von Tunzelmann criticized the film for factual inaccuracies and Olivier's unrealistic accent and blackface makeup. Literature professor Edward Said criticized Khartoum for what he described as a pro-colonial propagandistic portrayal of good versus evil by clashing "despotically violent Arab masculinity against a noble, rational Western one."

Film director Martin Scorsese said Khartoum was one of his guilty pleasures. "Charlton Heston... is marvelous; and Laurence Olivier has a lot of fun as the Mahdi, with a space between his front teeth. It isn't very good filmmaking, but it has a mystical quality about it. This was a holy war. At the end – when Mahdi killed Gordon, and then six months later he died himself – it was as if the two of them canceled each other out, religiously and historically. It's a story I want to be told, over and over again, like a fairy tale."

Editor Dennis Schwartz described the film as "a visually stunning historical epic, smartly acted and lavishly produced, that gives one a good look at that period’s political intrigues but does little to tell us about the two religious zealots–Gordon and the Mahdi."

Accolades

References
Notes

Citations

Bibliography
 Burton, Alan and O'Sullivan, Tim. (2009). The Cinema of Basil Dearden and Michael Relph. Edinburgh University Press
 Duiker, William and Spielvogel, Jackson. (2015). World History, Volume II: Since 1500. Cengage Learning
 Niemi, Robert. (2006). History in the Media. ABC Clio
 Santas, Constantine and others. (2014). The Encyclopaedia of Epic Films. Scarecrow Press
 Reid, John Howard. (2006). Cinemascope 3: Hollywood Takes the Plunge. Lulu.com
 George Batista Da Silva. (2015). Os Filmes De Charlton Heston. Clube de Autores
 Walker, John. (ed). (2004). Halliwell's Film Video & DVD Guide 2004. HarperCollins Entertainment. 19th edition

External links
 
 
  
 
 
 Khartoum at BFI

1966 films
1960s adventure drama films
1960s historical films
1960s war drama films
Adventure films based on actual events
War films based on actual events
British adventure drama films
British Empire war films
British historical films
British war epic films
British war drama films
Cultural depictions of Herbert Kitchener, 1st Earl Kitchener
Films about jihadism
Films directed by Basil Dearden
Films set in the 1880s
Films set in London
Films set in 1884
Films set in Egypt
Films set in 1885
Films set in 1883
Films set in Sudan
Films shot at Pinewood Studios
Films shot in Egypt
Khartoum in fiction
Films with screenplays by Robert Ardrey
Siege films
Films about the Mahdist War
1966 drama films
River adventure films
1960s English-language films
1960s British films